The Tampa Fire Rescue Department is the agency that provides fire protection and emergency medical services within the city of Tampa, Florida. The department is also responsible for the handling of hazardous materials, aircraft rescue at the city's Tampa International Airport, and marine firefighting. A division of the department headed by the Fire Marshal is responsible for fire investigations, as well as review and enforcement of fire and building safety codes.

History 

Tampa's first organized volunteer fire department began in 1884 with Seven "bucket brigades" organized to serve the city. Eleven years later in 1895, the city council passed an ordinance authorizing Tampa's first professional & paid fire department. In July 1914 the horse-drawn carriages were replaced with the first engines.

The city in which firefighters respond has changed. Included in its responsibility is Port Tampa Bay shipping 52 million tons of cargo per year and handling more hazardous materials than anywhere else in Florida. Tampa International Airport serves over 10 million travelers each year while the 75,000 seat Raymond James Stadium sees many travelers as well.

Marine Firefighting 
The TFRD is responsible for fire suppression, search and rescue and medical emergencies in and around Port Tampa Bay, the 7 largest port in the United States. Additionally they are responsible for all waters of Tampa Bay as far out as Egmont Key. The Port Authority and marine division maintains two  MetalCraft Marine vessel, a  Sea Ark and  Boston Whaler. In addition, Tampa Fire Rescue operates several RHIBs for use in shallow waters.

Stations and Apparatus

The TFD firefighting operations are based out of the city's 23 local fire stations.

References

External links

Government of Tampa, Florida
Fire departments in Florida